Professor Brian Graham Wilson  (1930-2019) was an Australian astrophysicist and academic. He served as Vice-Chancellor of the University of Queensland from 1979 to 1996, the role's longest tenure ever.

Prior to his career in academic administration, he was a noted researcher in astrophysics for over 15 years specialising in cosmic radiation, solar physics and x-ray astronomy.

References

1930 births
Officers of the Order of Australia
Recipients of the Centenary Medal